Cridge is a surname. Notable people with the surname include:

Annie Denton Cridge (1825–1875), British suffragist, socialist, lecturer, and author
Geoff Cridge (born 1995), New Zealand rugby union player